Charles Brown (born February 28, 1939) is a former amateur boxer from the United States who won the bronze medal in the Featherweight (−57 kg) division at the 1964 Tokyo Olympics. At the Pan American Games he won a silver medal in 1959 and a bronze medal in 1963.

Brown boxed out of the United States Marine Corps, and did not box as a professional.

1964 Olympic results
Below are the results of Charles Brown, an American featherweight boxer who competed at the 1964 Tokyo Olympics:
 
Defeated Randall Hope (Australia) by decision, 5–0
Defeated Soeun Khiru (Cambodia) by decision, 4–1
Defeated José Antonio Duran (Mexico) by decision, 4–1
Lost to Anthony Villanueva (Philippines) by decision, 1–4 (was awarded a bronze medal)

References

1939 births
Living people
Boxers at the 1964 Summer Olympics
Boxers from Cincinnati
Olympic bronze medalists for the United States in boxing
African-American boxers
American male boxers
Medalists at the 1964 Summer Olympics
Boxers at the 1959 Pan American Games
Boxers at the 1963 Pan American Games
Pan American Games silver medalists for the United States
Pan American Games bronze medalists for the United States
Pan American Games medalists in boxing
Featherweight boxers
Medalists at the 1959 Pan American Games
Medalists at the 1963 Pan American Games
21st-century African-American people
20th-century African-American sportspeople